The Priestess (Qrmuhin) written by Vigen Chaldranyan and renowned Armenian screenwriter Anahit Aghasaryan, draws inspiration from "an anonymous woman" recorded in the mysterious Fourth Century manuscript 'The History" by Armenian historian Agathangelos.

Plot
The film is set in Armenia, in present-day Yerevan, with scenes to the ancient past, circa 301 AD, a time when pagan gods and priestesses ruled the nation.

Production

Cinematic framing of the Armenian countryside nestled in front of a biblically famous Mount Ararat backdrop, creates a spectacular canvas to unfold this thought-provoking account, with memorable performances by Mesropyan and Chaldranian. The film is in Armenian accompanied by English subtitles, runs 109 minutes in length, with original music composed by Ara Gevorgyan and Nathan Lanier.

References

External links 
 
Armenian Movie "Priestess" To Premier In Los Angeles

Armenian drama films
Armenian-language films
Films set in the 4th century
Films set in Armenia
Mount Ararat